The 5th Annual Honda Civic Tour was a concert tour headlined by the American band Maroon 5.

Background
Fresh off the heels of their multiple Grammy nominations; the Marketing Factory, Inc. announced the band would headlined the fifth edition of their annual concert series, the Honda Civic Tour. This outing was announced in January 2005, during a press conference at the famed Whisky a Go Go. Speaking on the tour, bassist Mickey Madden stated:"This is the first headlining U.S. tour we've done in a long time. We're playing some of the biggest places we've ever played, which is very exciting. And we're taking out some bands that we really like and who are good friends. We grew up with Phantom Planet here in L.A. The Donnas add a nice variety. And the Thrills are a band we really like. Our crowds tend to be receptive to who we take out."

During moments in the tour, the band performed standalone concerts in Toronto and Vancouver, with additional shows at the Houston Livestock Show and Rodeo and Star of Texas Fair & Rodeo.

The final performance on May 13, 2005 at the Santa Barbara Bowl was recorded and released on the Live – Friday the 13th live album which came out on September 20, 2005.

Personnel
Crew
Sound Company : Rat Sound 
Bands FOH Engineer : Bryan Boyt 
Band Monitor Engineer : Andy Ebert 
Monitor Technician: Mark Humphries 
System Technician: Nick Brisbois 
Assistant Technician: Jamie Harris 
Tour Manager: Fred Kharrazi 
Production Manager: Joe Lennane

Opening acts
Phantom Planet 
The Donnas 
The Thrills 
Simon Dawes

Setlist
The following setlist was obtained from the concert held on March 13, 2005, at the Gibson Amphitheatre in Los Angeles, California. It does not represent all concerts for the duration of the tour. 
"Harder to Breathe"
"Not Coming Home"
"The Sun"
"Can't Stop"
"Sunday Morning" 
"Secret" 
"The Girl from Ipanema" / "Another Brick in the Wall (Part 2)"
"Through with You"
"Tangled"
"Woman"
"This Love"
"Wasted Years"
"Must Get Out"
"Sweetest Goodbye" 
Encore
"She Will Be Loved"
"Don't Look Back in Anger"

Shows

Box office score data

References

Honda Civic Tour
Honda Civic Tour
Honda Civic Tour
Honda Civic Tour
Maroon 5 concert tours
Concert tours of North America
Concert tours of the United States